The 2014–15 Northern Ireland Football League Cup (known as the WASP Solutions League Cup for sponsorship purposes) was the 29th edition of Northern Ireland's secondary football knock-out cup competition, and the second season of the competition under the control of the Northern Ireland Football League. It was contested by the 12 members of the NIFL Premiership and the 29 members of the NIFL Championship. The competition began on 12 August 2014 with the first round, and concluded on 24 January 2015 with the final.

Cliftonville were the defending champions, after they retained the trophy by defeating Crusaders 3–2 on penalties following a 0–0 draw after extra time in the 2014 final to win the cup for the second consecutive season. This season, Cliftonville successfully retained the Cup once again, defeating Ballymena United 3–2 in the final to win the Cup for the third consecutive season and the fourth time overall. They became only the second club to win the competition in three consecutive seasons, emulating Linfield's feat of three consecutive wins in 1997–98, 1998–99 and 1999–2000.

Format
The competition was played in a straight knock-out format and was open to all members of the NIFL Premiership and both divisions of the NIFL Championship. The top 16 ranked clubs from last season received byes into the second round, which included the 12 members of the 2013–14 NIFL Premiership and the top four ranked clubs from the 2013–14 NIFL Championship. Of the remaining 25 Championship clubs, 18 of them entered the competition in the first round, with the other seven given byes into the second round. Replays were not used in the competition, with all matches using extra time and penalties to determine the winner if necessary.

Changes from 2013–14
Killymoon Rangers were relegated from the NIFL Championship at the end of the previous season, and were replaced in the competition by Dollingstown, who made their League Cup debut this season following their promotion to the Championship for the first time. The number of competing clubs in the League Cup fell by one to 41 this season following Chimney Corner's resignation from the Championship. In July 2014, the club announced that they would be resigning to join the Ballymena & Provincial League for the 2014–15 season. As a result, the first round of the competition was adjusted to contain nine matches and seven byes, instead of the usual ten matches and six byes to make up the requisite number of 32 clubs in the second round.

First round
The draw for the first round was made randomly and included 25 of the 29 NIFL Championship clubs, with the top four ranked clubs from the 2013–14 NIFL Championship not entering until the second round. 7 of the 25 Championship clubs received a bye into the second round, leaving the remaining 18 Championship clubs in the first round to play a total of nine ties. The draw took place on 24 July 2014, with the matches being played on 12 August 2014. The seven clubs to receive byes were: Ballymoney United, Dollingstown, Donegal Celtic, Harland & Wolff Welders, Larne, Lisburn Distillery and Wakehurst.

|-
|colspan="3" style="background:#E8FFD8;"|12 August 2014

|}

Second round
The second round draw was completed on 13 August 2014, with the matches played on 25 August 2014. The draw was made up of the remaining 32 clubs, with a seeding system in place for this round. The 12 members of the 2013–14 NIFL Premiership entered this round as seeds, along with the top four ranked clubs from the 2013–14 NIFL Championship. The nine winners from the first round matches, and the seven clubs to receive byes into the second round were unseeded.

|-
|colspan="3" style="background:#E8FFD8;"|25 August 2014

|}

Third round
The 16 winners from the second round matches entered this round. The third round draw was completed on 30 August 2014, with the matches played on 7 October 2014. Six clubs from the second tier reached this stage, but there were no representatives from the third tier. A number of ties were switched after the original draw.

Quarter-finals
The 8 winners from the third round matches entered this round. The draw for the quarter-finals was made on 11 October 2014, with the matches played on 11 November 2014. Bangor was the lowest ranked club to reach the quarter-finals, as the only representative from outside the top flight.

Semi-finals
The semi-final draw took place on 15 November 2014, with the 4 quarter-final winners entering this round. Once again, Bangor was the lowest ranked club to reach this stage, as the only representative from outside the top flight. In reaching the semi-finals, Bangor became the first club from outside the top-flight to do so since Portadown in 2008–09.

Final
The final was played on 24 January 2015 at Windsor Park. Ballymena United reached the final for the first time, while Cliftonville were appearing in their third consecutive final and sixth final overall. Cliftonville completed a successful defence of the cup once again, lifting it for the third consecutive season and the fourth time overall.

See also
 2014–15 NIFL Premiership
 2014–15 NIFL Championship
 2014–15 Irish Cup

External links
NIFL official site

References

Lea
2014–15 European domestic association football cups
2014-15